Robert Naiman may refer to:

Robert Naiman (activist), American policy analyst and activist
Robert J. Naiman (born 1947), American professor and researcher of ecology